The Gateway to the Americas International Bridge is one of four vehicular international bridges located in the cities of Laredo, Texas, and Nuevo Laredo, Tamaulipas, that connect the United States and Mexico over the  Rio Grande (Río Bravo).  It is owned and operated by the City of Laredo and the Secretaría de Comunicaciones y Transportes (Mexico's federal Secretariat of Communication and Transportation). It is also known as Laredo International Bridge 1.

Description
The bridge is also known as the Convent Street Bridge, Laredo International Bridge, Bridge Number One, Old Bridge, Laredo-Nuevo Laredo Bridge 1, Puente Nuevo Laredo, Puente Laredo I, and Puente Viejo.

Location
This bridge is located in the San Agustin Historical District in Downtown Laredo on the United States Side and on the northern terminus of Mexican Federal Highway 85 in downtown Nuevo Laredo, Tamaulipas. It operates 24 hours a day for pedestrian traffic from and to Mexico. Renovations at the bridge lasting from April 2016 to October 2017 are finished and vehicular transit is resumed.

Border crossing

The Laredo Convent Avenue Port of Entry is located at the Gateway to the Americas International Bridge.  Since 1889, a bridge connected Laredo, Texas with Nuevo Laredo, Tamaulipas at this location.  For many years, this was the only crossing for vehicular and pedestrian traffic between the two cities.

The U.S. Inspection Station building that was built in 1943 was listed on the U.S. National Register of Historic Places in 1992.

As of 2018, all vehicular crossing from Mexico to the U.S. is now only for SENTRI holders only. All other vehicles have to cross through the Juárez–Lincoln International Bridge or through the Laredo–Colombia Solidarity International Bridge

History

The original bridge was constructed in the 1880s in a through truss design, the original Laredo International Foot Bridge was destroyed April 28, 1905 by a flood. It was repaired and again totally destroyed by flood on September 3, 1932. The city of Laredo and the Mexican government rebuilt the bridge to accommodate vehicles in 1932, surviving 22 years before it was destroyed again by flood in 1954.
The current bridge was constructed in 1954 and operational in 1956, has survived flooding with no damage and remains operational. The city of Laredo purchased the American side of the international bridge for $695,000 in 1946 from a private owner.

References

External links
 Gateway to the Americas International Bridge Webcam (American Side)
 Gateway to the Americas International Bridge Webcam (Mexican Side)
 Statistical Data

International bridges in Laredo, Texas
International bridges in Tamaulipas
Toll bridges in Texas
Nuevo Laredo
Bridges completed in 1933
Bridges completed in 1954
Road bridges in Texas
Toll bridges in Mexico
Box girder bridges in the United States
1954 establishments in Texas
1954 establishments in Mexico